Andy Jung may refer to:
 Andy Jung (pentathlete) (born 1961), Swiss pentathlete who competed at the 1984 and 1988 Summer Olympics
 Andy Jung (speed skater) (born 1997), Australian short track speed skater who competed at the 2018 Winter Olympics